Plugge is a surname. Notable people with the surname include:

 Arthur Plugge (1877–1934), New Zealand soldier who fought in World War I
 Plugge's Plateau Commonwealth War Graves Commission Cemetery
 Kim Plugge (born 1975), Swiss rower
 Leonard Plugge (1889–1981), British businessman and politician